The Finnish language has lent few loanwords to the English language; Finnish is rather a net importer of words from English.

However the following words of Finnish origin are some examples:

Widespread
The most commonly used Finnish word in English is sauna, which has also been loaned to many other languages.

Specialized
Words derived from Finnish used in more specialized fields:
aapa mire - a marsh type, in biology
palsa - low, often oval, frost heaves occurring in polar and subpolar climates
pulk - a type of toboggan (derivative of word pulkka)
puukko - traditional Finnish sheath knife
Rapakivi granite - a granite rock in petrology
taimen - a species of salmon living in Siberia

Cultural
In English, Finnish words used with reference to the Finnish culture, but not nativized in English and not used in other contexts:
sisu - the Finnish state of mind about strong character and 'grim forbearance,' has been documented in English since at least 1940.
kantele - a Finnish zither
motti - a Finnish military tactic
salmiakki - a salty liquorice and popular Finnish candy
Kilju - a homemade alcoholic beverage

See also
 List of English words of Sami origin
 Finnish name
 Finglish
 Finnish exonyms

External links

 English-Finnish-English Online Dictionary
 The Finnish Language: a list of resources
 Univie: SUOMALAIS homepage - in Finnish

Finnish language
Finnish